DocFetcher is a free and open source desktop search application. It runs on Windows, Mac OS X and Linux and is written in Java.  The application has a graphical user interface, which is written using the Standard Widget Toolkits. 

The program is an indexing search tool, meaning it has a local database of file content that it checks, rather than looking over all files on your machine.  This means the program must always be running to monitor changes, but search results are instant. Search tools are based on Apache Lucene software, a widely-used, open source search engine.

Features
 Unicode support
Full text search for all major document file formats, including:
Office files (Microsoft Office, OpenDocument, Outlook (PST), ...)
EPUB, PDF
RTF, SVG and any other plain text files
Audio metadata (MP3, FLAC)
Picture metadata (JPEG)
Archive formats (ZIP, 7z, RAR, Tar). Also supports nested archive files
HTML with pair detection. Which means that DocFetcher detects when an HTML file and a folder containing the resource files (Images, Scripts, ...) of the page belong together. (These resource files are usually downloaded when saving a Website)
 Possibility to automatically detect file changes and update the index accordingly
 Exclusion of files from indexing based on regular expressions
 A query language supporting boolean operators (OR, AND, NOT), wildcards, phrase search, fuzzy search and proximity search
 World languages: translations in Chinese, Italian, Ukrainian. Partly translated to French, Japanese, Spanish, and German.

Note that a commercial version of the program DocFetcher Pro is in development with additional features.

See also
List of desktop search engines

References

External links
docfetcher.sourceforge.net, official website
documentation wiki

Desktop search engines
Free search engine software
Cross-platform software
Java platform software
Free software programmed in Java (programming language)
Free and open-source software